Garret Kramer is an American author, speaker, coach, and teacher. He is the founder and managing partner of Inner Sports, a Morristown, New Jersey, firm specializing in non-duality and its relevance to performance, happiness, and sports psychology.

During the COVID-19 pandemic, Kramer claimed that the germ theory of disease lacks scientific evidence and asked that his audience explore for themselves before
getting the vaccine.

Early life and background
Born in Paterson, New Jersey and raised in nearby Clifton, Kramer graduated in 1980 from the Montclair Kimberley Academy, a secondary school in Montclair, New Jersey, where he played varsity ice hockey from 1977 to 1980. In the latter year, Kramer was the leading scorer in the New Jersey State Interscholastic Athletic Association and a first-team All-State selection. In 2008, he returned to Montclair Kimberley as head coach of the team.

Kramer earned a bachelor's degree in 1984 from Hamilton College in Clinton, New York, where he continued playing ice hockey. He then coached the junior varsity team at Hamilton for one year. Following his time at Hamilton, Kramer took up the game of golf and qualified for four USGA championships.

Career
In 1995, Kramer founded an organization called Inner Sports, which mentors performers, athletes, coaches, and organizations on one’s true nature, or Consciousness, and its bearing on performance. Kramer often conducts seminars and day-long workshops for the general public about exploring the nature of Self and its implications.

Forbes magazine wrote about Kramer: "His revolutionary approach to performance has transformed the careers of professional athletes and coaches, Olympians, and collegiate players across a multitude of sports." Kramer has appeared WFAN, WOR, ESPN, FOX, NBC, Golf Channel, CBS, and CTV.

Authorship
Kramer is the author of three books, Stillpower: Excellence With Ease in Sports and Life, which argues that knowing thyself is more important [in performance] than having a command of the skills and behaviors needed, The Path of No Resistance: Why Overcoming Is Simpler Than You Think, and True Self: Notes on the Essence of Being.

All-star ice hockey player Zach Parise wrote the foreword to Stillpower and told Sports Illustrated in 2010 that he often seeks Kramer’s counsel about handling the ebb and flow of life on and off the ice.

Personal
Kramer lives in New Jersey with his wife and three children.

References

Bibliography
 Kramer, "8 Surprising Characteristics of Winners at the London Olympics", Forbes, August 8, 2012
 "The Psychology Behind Coaches Like Mike Rice: Kramer television interview on "what drove the disgraced Rutgers basketball coach to lash out and abuse his players", On the Hunt, Fox News, April 4, 2013
 Kramer, "Feeling the Fall of Lance Armstrong, BigThink.com, January 28, 2013
 Kramer, "How Your Thoughts Influence Performance—On or Off the Playing Field," About.com
 Kramer, "Do You Set Expectations for Your Organization? Here's Why They're Not Working," Lifehack.com
 Kramer, "Deal With Failure: How to Turn Epic Fails Into Epic Wins," AskMen.com
 "Stillpower: The True Path to Flow, Clarity, and Responsiveness," Garret interview with Jake Cook, 99U.com

External links
 Official website
 

Writers from New Jersey
American exercise and fitness writers
American psychology writers
American male non-fiction writers
Hamilton Continentals men's ice hockey players
Montclair Kimberley Academy alumni
People from Clifton, New Jersey
People from Paterson, New Jersey
Living people
Year of birth missing (living people)